Nebraska is a state in the central United States.

Nebraska may also refer to:

Places
In Nebraska
Nebraska City, Nebraska
Nebraska National Forest

Elsewhere
10195 Nebraska, an asteroid
Nebraska, Arkansas, a ghost town
Nebraska, Indiana, an unincorporated place
Nebraska, Michigan, a ghost town
Nebraska, Ohio, a ghost town
Nebraska, Los Angeles County, California
Nebraska Township, Illinois, in Livingston County, Illinois
Nebraska Township, Iowa, in Page County, Iowa
South Nebraska, Tampa, Florida, a neighborhood

Art, entertainment, and media
Nebraska (film), a 2013 film by Alexander Payne
Nebraska (album), by Bruce Springsteen
"Nebraska" (song), title track from the eponymous album
"Nebraska" (The Walking Dead), an episode of the AMC television series The Walking Dead
"Nebraska", season 6, episode 7 of the Showtime television series Dexter
Nebraska (novel), a 1987 novel by George Whitmore

Ships
Two ships of the United States Navy:
USS Nebraska (BB-14), a battleship, in commission 1907–1920
USS Nebraska (SSBN-739), a submarine, in commission since 1993

Other
Nebraska Cornhuskers, the athletic program of the University of Nebraska–Lincoln
University of Nebraska–Lincoln

See also